The Buffalo Bills have been covered by numerous broadcasters, particularly through the Buffalo Bills Radio Network in radio.

Radio
The Buffalo Bills Radio Network is flagshipped at WGR (AM 550). Chris Brown (who previously called play-by-play for the Buffalo Bulls football and Buffalo Destroyers arena football teams before joining the Bills as a studio host) is the current play-by-play announcer. Eric Wood serves as the color analyst. The Bills radio network has eighteen affiliates in upstate New York, two affiliates in northwestern Pennsylvania, WBRR 100.1 FM in Bradford, Pennsylvania, WQHZ 102.3 FM in Erie, Pennsylvania, one affiliate, CJCL 590AM (The Fan) in Toronto, Ontario, Canada, and one affiliate, KGAB 650AM in Cheyenne, Wyoming.

Play-by-play
Van Miller (1960-1971, 1978-2003)
Al Meltzer and Rick Azar (1972-1977)
John Murphy (2004–2022, on extended medical leave)
Chris Brown (2023–present)

Color analysts
Dick Rifenburg and Ralph Hubbell (1960-1972)
Ed Rutkowski (1973-1977)
Stan Barron (1978-1983)
John Murphy (1984-1989, 1994-2003)
Greg Brown (1990-1993)
Alex Van Pelt (2004-2005)
Mark Kelso (2006–2018)
Eric Wood (2019–present)

Steve Tasker (2020-?)

Sideline reporters
Paul Peck (?-2003, 2005-2008)
Jeff Burris (2004-2005)
Rich "Bull" Gaenzler (2009-2011)
Joe Buscaglia (2012-2013)
Sal Capaccio (2014–present)

Studio hosts
Jim Brinson (2004)
Rich "Bull" Gaenzler (2005-2006)
Vic Carucci (2006-2008)
Brent Axe (2009-2011)
Mike Schopp and Chris "Bulldog" Parker (2012–present)

Television
During preseason, most games are televised on MSG Western New York per a rights deal between MSG and the team owners Terry and Kim Pegula and simulcasted on Buffalo's ABC affiliate, WKBW-TV channel 7 along with the stations of Nexstar Media Group elsewhere in upstate New York. WKBW's agreement expires after the 2019 season, at which point WIVB-TV, as a Nexstar affiliate, will take over as the official broadcast home of the Bills. Since 2008, preseason games have been broadcast in high definition.

As an American Football Conference team, the majority of Buffalo Bills regular season games air on CBS, which is carried in Buffalo on WIVB; Thursday night games, any home games in which the opponent is from the National Football Conference, and any games the league arbitrarily chooses to "cross-flex" air on Fox, whose local affiliate is WUTV. Sunday night games, should the Bills ever be selected for one, air on NBC, whose Buffalo affiliate is WGRZ. The rights to Monday night simulcasts from ESPN expired after 2017; as of August, it is unknown what station has purchased those rights.

As of 2021, the broadcast team consists of Andrew Catalon or Rob Stone on play-by-play, Steve Tasker as color commentator, and Cynthia Frelund as sideline reporter.

See also
List of Bills Toronto Series broadcasters

References

 
Buffalo Bills
Buffalo Bills
Broadcasters